is a private university in Hannō, Saitama, Japan, established in 1987. Aiming to produce people who can contribute to today's internationalized, information-oriented society, the university places emphasis on thorough small-class teaching, foreign language education, acquisition of rich computer skills, and preparation for certifying examinations.

History
His father, was one of the early Japanese students studying abroad in the Meiji period. He was accomplished as a Harvard- and Yale-trained scholar of English literature and a professor of Meiji University. Toshiharu successfully established a cram school, Sundai Preparatory School for high school students and had a lifelong dream of establishing an American-style liberal arts college in Japan.

Taking over the cram school and following his father's wishes, Haruyuki established Surugadai University as a college of law in 1987.

Since then, the college has evolved into a university of five undergraduate faculties and four graduate schools.

Campus

Undergraduate
Surugadai University has five undergraduate faculties: Faculty of Law, Faculty of Economics, Faculty of Media and Information Resources, Faculty of Contemporary Cultures, and Faculty of Psychology.

References

External links
 Official website 
 Official website in English

Educational institutions established in 1987
Private universities and colleges in Japan
Universities and colleges in Saitama Prefecture
1987 establishments in Japan
Hannō